Traycho Dimitrov Traykov is a Bulgarian politician. He was a Bulgarian Minister of Economy and Energy from 2009 to 2012. In February 2012 he launched an examination of dams in the south of the country after malfunction complaints. In March 2012 it was reported that he had been dismissed from his position allegedly for delaying work on energy projects; Bulgarian-language daily Bulgaria Dnes alleges that it was due to Belene Nuclear Power Plant specifically, a project which was terminated that month. Traykov himself "attributed the dismissal to his firm position in negotiations with Russia and his demands that Russia should cut the construction cost of the Belene plant, reduce gas prices by as much as 15 percent in a new supply contract and increase returns from the South Stream pipeline above 8 percent." He was succeeded by his former deputy, Delyan Dobrev.

Minister of Economy
Traicho Traykov was Minister of Economy in the first Boyko Borisov government. He was part of the Reformist Bloc, together with Deputy Prime Minister Simeon Djankov, Minister for Infrastructure Rosen Plevneliev and the Minister of Environment Nona Karadzhova.

Presidential Candidate
On 1 September 2016, the Reformist Bloc announced that Traycho Traykov would run in the 2016 Bulgarian presidential election. His running mate was General Sabi Sabev. During the whole election campaign, Traykov was targeted by media owned by Delyan Peevski who is currently nominated for sanctions under the US Magnitsky Act. Social activists were worried that the main purpose of the black PR campaign was to neutralize Traykov who appealed to progressive voters. Traykov eventually came in sixth in the presidential race with 5.87% of the votes. He received strong support from Bulgarians living in Germany.

References

1970 births
Living people
Government ministers of Bulgaria
Candidates for President of Bulgaria